Ahuva Kraus-Kravitzky (1932–2009) was an Israeli female track and field athlete and basketball player. She won a gold medal in the high jump at the 1954 Asian Games.

Born in Rehovot, she joined the local Hapoel sports club. She won gold medals in that event at the Maccabiah Games in 1950 and 1953, as well as the title at the 1956 Hapoel Games. She led her club's basketball section to a national championship and cup double in 1961.

References

1932 births
2009 deaths
People from Rehovot
Israeli female high jumpers
Israeli women's basketball players
Asian Games gold medalists for Israel
Asian Games medalists in athletics (track and field)
Athletes (track and field) at the 1954 Asian Games
Medalists at the 1954 Asian Games
Maccabiah Games medalists in athletics
Maccabiah Games gold medalists for Israel
20th-century Israeli women